Røst is a small island municipality in Nordland county, Norway. It is part of the traditional district of Lofoten. The administrative centre of the municipality is the village of Røstlandet on the island of Røstlandet.

The island municipality is very small and is essentially a large fishing village centered around Røstlandet. Many of the residents are involved in the fishing industry or support the industry. There are six fish farms in Røst. During the main fishing season, there can be up to 600 fishing boats based out of Røst.

The  municipality is the 353rd largest by area out of the 356 municipalities in Norway. Røst is the 351st most populous municipality in Norway with a population of 469.

General information

The municipality of Røst was established on 1 July 1928 when it was separated from Værøy Municipality. Initially, it had 731 residents. The municipal boundaries have not changed since that time.

Name
The municipality is named after the main island of Røstlandet (Old Norse: Rǫst). The name is identical with the word rǫst which means "maelstrom". (See Moskstraumen.)

Coat of arms
The coat of arms was granted on 28 November 1986. The official blazon is "Argent, three cormorants issuant from the base sable". This means the arms have a field (background) that has a tincture of argent which means it is commonly colored white, but if it is made out of metal, then silver is used. The charge is three black European shags (Gulosus aristotelis), which is a species of cormorant. The design was chosen to symbolize a local legend of three brothers who could transform themselves into cormorants. This story was recounted by Asbjørnsen and Moe, the famous collectors of Norwegian folklore. The arms were designed by Arvid Sveen.

Churches
The Church of Norway has one parish within the municipality of Røst. It is part of the Bodø domprosti (arch-deanery) in the Diocese of Sør-Hålogaland.

History
A vivid description of medieval island life has been delivered by the shipwrecked Venetian sea captain Pietro Querini, who was rescued by the islanders in 1432. He described the society as very harmonious and pious, and described how they made a living from fishing cod and some agriculture. The Norwegian Lundehund originated from this part of Norway, where it natively would have climbed along cliff paths to hunt puffins. Fishing is the main economic activity on Røst.

Culture
The island has a rich cultural life. Every year in June there is a popular festival in honor of the puffin (Lundefestivalen).

Querini opera
In 2012, the Querini Opera was shown on Røst for the first time, telling the dramatic story about Pietro Querini who shipwrecked on Røst in 1432. The show was a great success and was shown again in 2014.

Literary Park Pietro Querini 
In 2017, the Pietro Querini Literary Park (litteraturpark på Røst) was established with the Municipality of Røst, the Dante Committee, I Parchi Letterari Network and the support of the Embassy of Italy. The park started its activity in 2018. https://www.parchiletterari.com/parchi/pietro-querini-063/vita.php

Government
All municipalities in Norway, including Røst, are responsible for primary education (through 10th grade), outpatient health services, senior citizen services, unemployment and other social services, zoning, economic development, and municipal roads. The municipality is governed by a municipal council of elected representatives, which in turn elect a mayor.  The municipality falls under the Salten District Court and the Hålogaland Court of Appeal.

Municipal council
The municipal council  of Røst is made up of 11 representatives that are elected to four year terms. The party breakdown of the council is as follows:

Mayor
The mayors of Røst (incomplete list):
1929-1941: Mathias Skaar (H)
1988-1999: Arnfinn Ellingsen (V)
1999-2007: Paul Rånes (Kyst)
2007-2011: Arnfinn Ellingsen (V)
2011-2019: Tor-Arne Andreassen (Ap)
2019–present: Elisabeth Mikalsen (LL)

Transportation

As an isolated island municipality, there are no road connections to Røst. It can be reached by boat and airplane. There are ferry connections to the neighboring island of Værøya and also to the nearby town of Bodø on the mainland. Røst Airport has regularly scheduled flights to Bodø.

Economy
During the winter, the population of Røst gets doubled due to the number of boats arriving at Røst to fish.

Environment

Geography
Skomvær Lighthouse is located in the southern part of the municipality on the small island of Skomvær. Most inhabitants live on the main island of Røstlandet, but a few other islands are also inhabited. These islands are linked to Røstlandet with roads, causeways, and bridges. South of Røstlandet, there are several small islands that are dominated by large mountains including Vedøya, Storfjellet, Trenyken, Hærnyken, and Ellevsnyken.

Birdlife
Røst is one of the few bird watching localities in Norway that is known worldwide. The seabird colonies that are to be found are regarded as internationally important. The islands offer a range of habitats, and as one would expect, a stop-over point for many species that are migrating even further north. During the last few years, birders have been showing an interest for Røst during the autumn, producing a whole range of rarities.

The municipality also has one of the largest bird cliffs in the North Atlantic, with puffin colonies, as well as colonies of shag, kittiwake, and cormorants. A 16,000 ha area encompassing the Røst archipelago and its adjacent marine waters has been designated an Important Bird Area (IBA) by BirdLife International because it supports large breeding colonies of European shags and Atlantic puffins. Other birds breeding in the IBA include European storm petrels, Leach's storm petrels, razorbills, common murres, northern fulmars and black-legged kittiwakes. The IBA contains the Røstlandet and Nykan nature reserves as well as the 7000 ha Røstøyan Ramsar site.

Climate
Despite being north of the Arctic Circle, Røst features a subpolar oceanic climate (Köppen Cfc), bordering on an extremely rare cold-summer mediterranean climate (Köppen Csc). Røst and Værøy were earlier known by meteorologists as the most northern locations in the world with average temperatures above freezing all winter, but with the updated 1991-2020 normals there are more northern locations in Norway with average temperatures above freezing all winter. The winter temperatures in southern Lofoten represent the largest temperature anomaly in the world relative to latitude. The wettest months are October through December with approximately  precipitation each month, and the driest period is during May and June with on average of  each month. The average date for the last overnight freeze (low below ) in spring is April 22 and average date for first freeze in autumn is November 5  giving a frost-free season of 196 days (1981-2010 average).

In popular culture
"The Half Brother" by Lars Saabye Christensen is a book about Røst.

References

External links
Municipal fact sheet from Statistics Norway 

Røst at Google Maps
Querini opera

 
Municipalities of Nordland
1928 establishments in Norway
Populated places of Arctic Norway
Tourist attractions in Nordland
Ramsar sites in Norway
Nature reserves in Norway
Important Bird Areas of Norway
Important Bird Areas of Arctic islands
Seabird colonies